Stenoecia dos is a species of moth of the family Noctuidae. It is known in south-eastern Europe, including Bosnia and Herzegovina, Croatia, North Macedonia, Slovenia, Serbia, Kosovo, Voivodina and Montenegro, as well as in Turkey.

The wingspan is about 20 mm.

External links
 Checklist of the Turkish Lepidoptera
 Fauna Europaea
 Lepiforum e.V.

Heliothinae
Insects of Europe
Insects of Turkey